The Wanderer is the debut album by O.A.R.,  released in 1997.  The album was recorded at Gizmo Recording Company in Silver Spring, Maryland with engineer/producer Gantt Kushner while the band was still in high school, and without a record label.  The original album artwork and design was conceived of by Jed Tamarkin.  The name Of A Revolution was too long to make into a logo so Jed shortened it to simply the acronym O.A.R., its first use as a reference to the band. Online distribution helped make the album popular on college campuses, where O.A.R. attained much of their fan base.

Track listing
 "Missing Pieces" – 2:50
 "That Was a Crazy Game of Poker" – 8:42
 "Black Rock" – 4:19
 "Conquering Fools" – 2:50
 "Get Away" - 5:19
 "About an Hour Ago" – 5:21
 "Toy Store" – 7:30
 "About Mr. Brown" – 5:15
 "Ladanday" – 7:01

Personnel
Marc Roberge - rhythm guitar, vocals
Chris Culos - drums
Richard On - lead guitar
Benj Gershman - bass

References

1997 albums
O.A.R. albums